The Petrokerasa Folklore Museum (aka the Folklore Museum of Petrokerasa) is located in the village of Petrokerasa, Thessaloniki, Greece. It is situated in the highlands north of the Chalkidiki peninsula.

The museum was founded in 1976, aiming to preserve and perpetuate the local folk tradition and folk heritage. The museum has four rooms, in which 750 objects exclusively from Petrokerasa are displayed. The first room has weapons (flintlocks, powder magazines, sabres), a large Byzantine oil jar, and the documents granting the village the privilege of hosting a piece of the True Cross on Palm Sunday every year without fail since 1767. In the second room there is a complete loom with all its accessories, together with a variety of woven textiles produced in the village. The third room contains traditional costumes from the village, both men's and women's, contemporary underwear, and all the old ecclesiastical books, codices, and manuscripts relating to the history of the village. In the fourth room tools of various trades and occupations are displayed such as tile-making, carpentry, hunting, beekeeping, viniculture, horse-grooming, and agriculture. Of particular note are a traditional wooden ard or scratch plough, and a metal plough.

Gallery

Sources

References

1976 establishments in Greece
Museums established in 1976
Folk museums in Central Macedonia
Buildings and structures in Thessaloniki (regional unit)